José Hernández-Fernández (born March 13, 1990) is a professional male tennis player from the Dominican Republic.

Tennis career
Hernández-Fernández reached his highest singles ranking on the ATP Tour of World No. 179 in August 2015 and his highest doubles ranking of No. 206 in 2016. He has played primarily on the Futures circuit with a record of 74-40 and the ATP Challenger Tour where he currently has a record of 5-11.

Hernández-Fernández is a member of the Dominican Republic Davis Cup team, having posted a 7–5 record in singles and a 5–1 record in doubles in eighteen ties played since 2006.

Hernández-Fernández has represented the Dominican Republic in multiple international competitions.  Hernández-Fernández partnered with countrywoman Chandra Capozzi in the mixed doubles competition at the 2010 Central American and Caribbean Games, winning the bronze medal. He also represented the Dominican Republic at the 2011 Pan American Games, though did not win any medals at the Games.

He currently resides in Barcelona and trains at the JC Ferrero Equelite Sport Academy in Alicante.

Junior career

Ranked No. 37 in the world junior rankings by the International Tennis Federation. Reached the round of 16 in the U.S. Open Junior Tennis Championships. He played in the 2008 Wimbledon Junior Championships losing to the 2008 French Open champion Yang Tsung-hua . Reached the round of 32 in the main draw of the Roland Garros Junior Championships. Won the JITIC tournament in Monterrey, Mexico. Made the finals of the Copa Merengue tournament in Santo Domingo, Dominican Republic. Finalist of the Barranquilla Junior Tennis Tournament in Barranquilla, Colombia.

College career

Prior to joining UNC Hernández-Fernández received offers from Texas A&M, Ohio State, Pepperdine, among others.  

Hernández-Fernández played tennis at the University of North Carolina in Chapel Hill. In 2011, he reached the round of 16 in the 2011 NCAA Division I Tennis Championships losing to the previous year champion Bradley Klahn from Stanford.  

He finished his career at UNC ranked No. 9 in singles and ranked No. 6 in doubles in the nation in the 2012 pre-season NCAA Div 1 rankings before turning pro. He was twice a member of the "All-ACC" team. Combined record at UNC was 48 wins and 17 losses.

ATP Challenger and ITF Futures finals

Singles: 16 (9–7)

Doubles: 14 (6–8)

References

External links
 
 
 

1990 births
Living people
Dominican Republic male tennis players
Tennis players at the 2011 Pan American Games
Pan American Games competitors for the Dominican Republic
Central American and Caribbean Games silver medalists for the Dominican Republic
Central American and Caribbean Games bronze medalists for the Dominican Republic
Competitors at the 2010 Central American and Caribbean Games
Competitors at the 2014 Central American and Caribbean Games
Tennis players at the 2019 Pan American Games
Central American and Caribbean Games medalists in tennis
Tennis players at the 2007 Pan American Games
White Dominicans
21st-century Dominican Republic people